Eocronartium is a monotypic genus of fungi belonging to the family Eocronartiaceae. It only contains one known species, Eocronartium muscicola (Pers.) Fitzp.

The genus and species has almost cosmopolitan distribution, it is not recorded in Russia, Greenland or parts of northern Canada.

Former species;
 Eocronartium muscigena  = Eocronartium muscicola
 Eocronartium typhuloides  = Eocronartium muscicola

References

Pucciniomycotina
Basidiomycota genera